The Grand Raid de la Réunion, also called La diagonale des fous (The Bishops'/Madmen's Diagonal) is a mountain ultramarathon race.  The race takes place annually in October on Réunion island, a French overseas department in the Indian Ocean, situated between Madagascar and Mauritius.  The 162 km route with 9643 m of elevation gain is reputed to be highly challenging, brutally difficult and one of the hardest footraces in the world.

Category of course 

Three races are held at the same time:

Dates of races in 2017 

 25th edition of the Diagonale des fous: 19 to 22 October 
 18th edition of the Trail de Bourbon: October 
 7th edition of the Mascareignes: October

Winners

Men

Women

References

Related books 

 "Grand Raid Reunion Island", a 68 pages comic book edited by UltraBD

External links

Official web site of Grand Raid de la Réunion
Official forum of the web site of Grand Raid de la Réunion

Ultra-Trail World Tour
Sports competitions in Réunion
Athletics in Réunion
Recurring sporting events established in 1989
1989 establishments in Réunion
Ultramarathons in France
Trail running competitions